Royal Edward Dano Sr. (November 16, 1922 - May 15, 1994) was an American actor. In a career spanning 46 years, he was perhaps best known for playing cowboys, villains, and Abraham Lincoln. Dano also provided the voice of the Audio-Animatronic Lincoln for Walt Disney's Great Moments with Mr. Lincoln attraction at the 1964 World's Fair (brought to Disneyland in 1965), as well as Lincoln's voice at the "Hall of Presidents" attraction at Disney's Magic Kingdom in 1971.

Early life
Dano was born in New York City on November 16, 1922, the eldest of three siblings born to Mary Josephine (née O'Connor), an Irish immigrant, and Caleb Edward Dano, a printer for newspapers.

Career
Dano appeared as McSnoyd the leprechaun in the stage show Barnaby and Mr. O'Malley, based on the comic strip by Crockett Johnson. McSnoyd appears to the audience only as a blinking light on a large mushroom, so only his voice is heard.  However, at the conclusion of the show Dano joined the rest of the cast, wearing a leprechaun costume.

Dano is remembered for his supporting roles in a number of 1950s western and mystery films. The chance for the breakout role of a lifetime escaped him in the theatrical release of The Red Badge of Courage. Dano, cast as The Tattered Man, delivered such a disturbing performance in his death scene, according to director John Huston, that the initial test audience left the theater in droves, e.g., "I've never seen so many people get up and leave the theater...they liked no part of it." The death scene was lent a human touch by Dano, and in 1951, war-weary Americans rejected it (Huston: "...[the audience rejection] was a pretty sickening event."). Red Badge was immediately recut, and the death scene was removed. It is long believed, and as early as Huston commenting in an interview in 1972, the scene has been lost ("I doubt very much, whether the scene still exists."). 

He often worked with Anthony Mann and James Stewart.  Over the years, Dano made many television appearances, often in bizarre, macabre roles.  Dano was also a frequent guest star on Gunsmoke, with a total of thirteen appearances.

Dano was the voice of Abraham Lincoln for Walt Disney's Great Moments with Mr. Lincoln attraction, first presented at the 1964 World's Fair. Disney personally selected Dano, because he felt the actor came closest to the historical descriptions of Lincoln's voice. Great Moments with Mr. Lincoln was moved to Disneyland in 1965, and Dano's vocals continued to be a part of the attraction until 2001. In 1971, his voice was also used for a revised Lincoln speech in the new "Hall of Presidents" attraction at Magic Kingdom in Florida, which ran to 1993. 

He died of pulmonary fibrosis on May 15, 1994, in Santa Monica, California.  

In 2009, Dano's vocals were returned to Great Moments with Mr. Lincoln at Disneyland in an updated version of the show.

Selected filmography

Undercover Girl (1950) as The Moocher
Under the Gun (1951) as Sam Nugent
The Red Badge of Courage (1951) as The Tattered Soldier
Flame of Araby (1951) as Basra
Bend of the River (1952) as Long Tom
Carrie (1952) as Captain (uncredited)
Johnny Guitar (1954) as Corey
The Far Country (1954) as Luke
The Trouble with Harry (1955) as Deputy Sheriff Calvin Wiggs
Gunsmoke (1955-1971, TV Series) as Henry Mather / Watney / Gideon Hale / Jessup / Jefferson Dooley / Rory Luken / Lambert Haggen / Praylie / Bender / Seth Tandy / Obie Tater
Tribute to a Bad Man (1956) as Abe
Moby Dick (1956) as 'Elijah'
Santiago (1956) as Lobo
Tension at Table Rock (1956) as Harry Jameson
Crime of Passion (1957) as Police Capt. Charlie Alidos
All Mine to Give (1957) as Howard Tyler
Father Knows Best (1957, TV Series) as Sageman
Trooper Hook (1957) as Mr. Trude, Stage Driver
Man in the Shadow (1957) as Aiken Clay
The Millionaire (1957, TV Series) as Hap Connolly
Alfred Hitchcock Presents (1957-1960, TV Series) as Mr. Atkins / Martin Ross
The Restless Gun (1957) Episode "Cheyenne Express" as Wilbur English
Saddle the Wind (1958) as Clay Ellison
Handle with Care (1958) as Al Lees
Man of the West (1958) as Trout
Never Steal Anything Small (1959) as Words Cannon
These Thousand Hills (1959) as Ike Carmichael
The Boy and the Bridge (1959) as Evangelist
Face of Fire (1959) as Jake Winter
Wanted: Dead or Alive (1959, TV Series) as Charlie Wright
Hound-Dog Man (1959) as Fiddling Tom Waller
Route 66 (1961, TV Series, episode "Most Vanquished, Most Victorious") as Doctor 
Wagon Train (1959-1963, TV Series) as John Bouchette / Boone Caulder
The Rifleman (1959-1962, TV Series) as Reverend Jamison / Able 'Abe' Lincoln / Aaron Wingate / Jonas Epps / Frank Blandon
The Rebel (ABC-TV, 1959–1961, TV Series) as Ben Crowe / Amos Cooper
The Adventures of Huckleberry Finn (1960) as Sheriff Harlan
Cimarron (1960) as Ike Howes (photographer)
Have Gun Will Travel (1960) as Curley Ashburne
Tales of Wells Fargo (1960-1962, TV Series) as Robert Mapes / Cole Younger
Posse from Hell (1961) as Uncle Billy
King of Kings (1961) as Peter
Mr. Magoo's Christmas Carol (animated TV special) (1962, TV Movie) as Marley's Ghost (voice)
Rawhide (1962-1965, TV Series) as Sam Wentworth / Mr. Teisner / Jeb Newton / Monty Fox
The Virginian (1962-1966, TV Series) as Uncle Dell Benton / Daniels / Faraway McPhail / Dan Molder
Bonanza (NBC-TV, 1962–1967, TV Series) as Matt Jeffers / Hank Penn / Jason Ganther
The Dakotas (ABC, 1963, TV Series) as Rev. Walter Wyman
Savage Sam (1963) as Pack Underwood (uncredited)
Mr. Novak (NBC-TV, 1963, TV Series) as Mr. Metcalfe
The Travels of Jaimie McPheeters (ABC-TV, 1964, TV Series) as James Weston
7 Faces of Dr. Lao (1964) as Carey
The Alfred Hitchcock Hour (1964, TV Series) as Mr. Miley
Gunsmoke (1964, TV Series) as Praylie
The Fugitive (1964, TV Series, episode "When the Bough Breaks") as Preacher
Death Valley Days (1965-1970, TV Series) as Andrew Bonney / Hannibal McCall / Aaron Winters / Henderson Lewelling
Lost in Space (1966, TV Series, episode: 27, "The Lost Civilization") as Major Domo
Gunpoint (1966) as Ode
Daniel Boone (NBC-TV, 1966–1967, TV Series) as John Maddox / Matty Brenner
The Big Valley (1966-1969, TV Series) as Ezra / The Vet / Jesse Bleeck / Rufus Morton
Welcome to Hard Times (1967) as John Bear
The Last Challenge (1967) as Pretty Horse
Gunsmoke (1967) as Lambert Haggen
Day of the Evil Gun (1968) as Dr. Eli Prather
If He Hollers, Let Him Go! (1968) as Carl Blair
Death of a Gunfighter (1969) as Arch Brandt
The Undefeated (1969) as Maj. Sanders, CSA (one-armed major)
Hawaii Five-O (1970, TV Series) as Hody Linquist
Run, Simon, Run (1970, TV Movie) as Sheriff Tacksberry
Skin Game (1971) as John Brown (abolitionist)
The Culpepper Cattle Co. (1972) as Cattle Rustler
The Great Northfield Minnesota Raid (1972) as Gustavson
Moon of the Wolf (1972, TV Movie) as Tom Sr.
Emergency! (1972-1976, TV Series) as Sam / Hallucinating Man
Kung Fu (1973, TV Series) as Henry Skowrin
Ace Eli and Rodger of the Skies (1973) as Jake
Messiah of Evil (1973) as Joseph Lang
Cahill U.S. Marshal (1973) as MacDonald, Hermit who sells Cahill the mule
Electra Glide in Blue (1973) as Coroner
Planet of the Apes (1974, TV Series) as Farrow
Big Bad Mama (1974) as Reverend Johnson
Adam-12 (1975, TV Series) as Walter Covey
The Wild Party (1975) as Tex
Huckleberry Finn (1975, TV Movie) as Mark Twain
Capone (1975) as Anton J. Cermak
The Outlaw Josey Wales (1976) as Ten Spot
Drum (1976) as Zeke Montgomery
The Killer Inside Me (1976) as Father
Hughes and Harlow: Angels in Hell (1977) as Will Hays
Bad Georgia Road (1977) as Arthur Pennyrich
Quincy, M.E. (1977, TV Series) as Dr. Williams / Holsang
The One Man Jury (1978) as Bartender           
In Search of Historic Jesus (1979, Documentary) as Prophet #1
The Last Ride of the Dalton Gang (1979, TV Movie) as Pa Dalton
Little House on the Prairie (1979-1981, TV Series) as Mr. Hector Webb / Harold
Take This Job and Shove It (1981) as Beeber
Hammett (1982) as Pops
Something Wicked This Way Comes (1983) as Tom Fury
The Right Stuff (1983) as Minister
Teachers (1984) as Ditto Stiles
Cocaine Wars (1985) as Bailey
Amazing Stories (1986, TV Series) as Elmer Quick / Salvation Army Officer
Red Headed Stranger (1986) as Larn Claver
House II: The Second Story (1987) as Gramps
Date with an Angel (1987) as Treating Doctor in Hospital (uncredited)
Once Upon a Texas Train (1988, TV Movie) as Nitro Jones
Killer Klowns from Outer Space (1988) as Farmer Gene Green
Ghoulies II (1988) as Uncle Ned
Spaced Invaders (1990) – Wrenchmuller
Twin Peaks (1990) as Judge Clinton Sternwood
The Dark Half (1993) as Digger Holt (final film role)

References

Further reading

External links

 
 
 
 

1922 births
1994 deaths
American male film actors
American male television actors
United States Army personnel of World War II
Male actors from New York City
Military personnel from New York City
American people of Irish descent
Burials at Los Angeles National Cemetery
20th-century American male actors
Western (genre) television actors
United States Army soldiers